Druyes-les-Belles-Fontaines is a commune in the Yonne department in Bourgogne-Franche-Comté in north-central France, in the natural region of Forterre.

It is well known for several historic monuments including the ruins of the château de Druyes, the city gate, the Romanesque church of Druyes-les-Belles-Fontaines, and the lavoir.

See also
Communes of the Yonne department

References

Communes of Yonne